Enshū Sea is the sea area from Cape Irōzaki in Shizuoka Prefecture to Cape Daiō in Mie Prefecture. It is also called Tōtōmi Sea or Tenryū Sea.

References 

Seas of Japan